Kim Young-mi (born 18 August 1960) is a South Korean sport shooter who competed in the 1984 Summer Olympics and in the 1988 Summer Olympics.

References

External links
 
 

1960 births
Living people
South Korean female sport shooters
ISSF rifle shooters
Olympic shooters of South Korea
Shooters at the 1984 Summer Olympics
Shooters at the 1988 Summer Olympics
Asian Games medalists in shooting
Asian Games bronze medalists for South Korea
Shooters at the 1986 Asian Games
Medalists at the 1986 Asian Games
20th-century South Korean women
21st-century South Korean women